Caldwell Independent School District is a public school district based in Caldwell, Texas (US).

The district serves northern and western portions of Burleson County.

In 2009 the school district was rated "academically acceptable" by the Texas Education Agency.

Schools
Caldwell High School (Grades 9–12)
Caldwell Middle (Grades 7–8)
Caldwell Intermediate (Grades 5–6)
Caldwell Elementary (Grades PK–4)

References

External links
Caldwell ISD

School districts in Burleson County, Texas